Blood Fire Death is the fourth studio album by Swedish extreme metal band Bathory. It was released on 8 October 1988, through Music for Nations sublabel, Under One Flag. The album, although mostly black metal, includes some of the first examples of Viking metal. According to the book Black Metal: Evolution of the Cult by Dayal Patterson, Blood Fire Death began a second trilogy, an era Quorthon described as the "pre-Christian Swedish Viking Era".

Background and recording 

The lyrics to "For All Those Who Died" were taken from a poem by Erica Jong, first published in her book Witches (1981), while the first three verses of "A Fine Day to Die" are taken from "Cassilda's Song" of Robert W. Chambers' The King in Yellow.

The front cover comes from the painting The Wild Hunt of Odin (1872) by Peter Nicolai Arbo. The painting as well as the opening track "Oden's Ride Over Nordland" use the Wild Hunt motif from folklore. Blood Fire Death established this motif in metal culture, where it since has become popular with a number of bands and event organizers.

Critical reception 

In 2009, IGN included Blood Fire Death in their "10 Great Black Metal Albums" list.

Track listing 

Note: The "Outro" is not listed on the cover and is not included on the cassette release.

Personnel 
Bathory
 Quorthon – guitars, vocals, percussion, effects, producer, engineer, mixing
 Vvornth – drums
 Kothaar – bass

Production
 Boss (Börje Forsberg) – producer, engineer, mixing
 Peter Nicolai Arbo – album cover painting, The Wild Hunt of Odin (Åsgårdsreien)
 Pelle Matteus – sleeve photography

References 

Bathory (band) albums
1988 albums
Black metal albums by Swedish artists
Viking metal albums